Luteostriata graffi is a species of Brazilian land planarian in the subfamily Geoplaninae.

Description 
The dorsal color is gold-yellow with five black longitudinal stripes: one median, two paramedian and two lateral, the median being the thinnest and the paramedian the broadest. The anterior end has a slight orange tinge and the ventral side is yellowish white.

Etymology 
The specific epithet graffi honors the zoologist Ludwig von Graff, who first described the species, but misidentified it as Geoplana marginata Schultze & Müller, 1858.

Distribution 
Luteostrata graffi is known to occur in areas of Araucaria moist forest and Seasonal forests in the northeastern region of Rio Grande do Sul, Brazil. It occurs in the São Francisco de Paula National Forest and in the Aparados da Serra National Park.

References 

Geoplanidae
Invertebrates of Brazil